TUI Group is a German leisure, travel and tourism company. TUI is an acronym for Touristik Union International ("Tourism Union International"). TUI AG was known as Preussag AG until 1997 when the company changed its activities from mining to tourism. It is headquartered in Hanover, Germany.

It fully or partially owns several travel agencies, hotel chains, cruise lines and retail shops as well as five European airlines. The group owns the largest holiday aeroplane fleet in Europe and holds multiple European tour operators. It is trading as TUI AG jointly listed on the Frankfurt Stock Exchange and the London Stock Exchange as a constituent of the FTSE 250 Index.

History

The origins of the company lie in the industrial and transportation company Preussag AG, which was originally formed as a German mining company. It was incorporated on 9 October 1923, as Preußische Bergwerks- und Hütten-Aktiengesellschaft (Prussian Mine and Foundry Company). In 1927 it was merged with the Ruhr coal company, Hibernia AG, and electricity utility to become the Vereinigte Elektrizitäts und Bergwerks AG (VEBA AG) (United Electrical and Mining Company).

After the sale of Salzgitter AG and purchase of Hapag-Lloyd AG (the navigation and logistics company) in 1997, Preussag AG became a global enterprise in the service and leisure industry. At that time, Hapag-Lloyd held a 30% interest in the tourism conglomerate TUI (founded 1968), increased to 100% by 1999. In addition the company acquired 25% of Thomas Cook shares in 1997, which it doubled the following year. On 2 February 1999, the Carlson Leisure Group merged with Thomas Cook into a holding company owned by the German bank Westdeutsche Landesbank, Carlson Inc and Preussag. However, in mid-2000 Preussag acquired Thomas Cook's rival Thomson Travel and was forced to sell its majority 50.1% stake in Thomas Cook by regulatory authorities. In 2002, Preussag renamed itself TUI AG.

TUI announced a merger of its travel division with the British tour operator First Choice in March 2007, which was approved by the European Commission on 4 June 2007, on the condition that the merged company sell Budget Travel in Ireland. TUI held a 55% stake in the new company, TUI Travel PLC, which began operations in September 2007.

In April 2008, Alexey Mordashov, who purchased his first shares in TUI Travel in autumn 2007, purchased additional TUI Travel shares under S-Group in order to expand TUI Travel into Eastern Europe and Russia.

Its logistics activities, concentrated in the shipping sector, were kept separate and bundled within Hapag-Lloyd AG. A majority stake in Hapag-Lloyd was sold to the Albert Ballin consortium of investors in March 2009 and a further stake was sold to Ballin in February 2012, as TUI worked to exit from the shipping business and to optimize its tourism business with expansion in Russia, China and India under Michael Frenzel. Prior to August 2010, John Fredriksen held the largest Norwegian privately held stake in TUI Travel and had a significant influence upon TUI Travel's direction and strategy. As Alexey Mordashov through his S-Group Travel Holding increased his stake in TUI Travel to a stake larger than Fredriksen's stake, the shipping business had to be sold.

In June 2014 the company announced it would fully merge with TUI Travel to create a united group with a value of $US9.7 billion. The merger was completed on 17 December 2014 and the combined business began trading on the Frankfurt and London stock exchanges. Prior to this merger, Alexey Mordashov, the largest private shareholder in TUI Travel, held a blocking stake in TUI Travel through his S-Group. After the merger, Alexey Mordashov's stake was reduced to less than a blocking stake of 25%.

On 12 December 2016, Alexey Mordashov increased his stake in TUI Group from 18% to more than 20%. In October 2018, his 24.9% stake is the largest privately held stake in TUI Group. When Mordashov's stake increases to 25%, he will have a blocking stake in TUI Group at its annual meeting. In June 2019 Mordashov  transferred 65% of his stake to the KN-Holding, owned by his sons Kirill Mordashov and Nikita Mordashov. TUI says in a statement that they ”welcome the second generation of the family amongst its shareholders”.

In August 2020, the company reported a net loss of €2.3 billion (from October 2019 to June 2020) as a result of the COVID-19 pandemic. Out of the sum, €1.5 billion loss related to the period from April to June 2020, while the revenue for the same period was €75 million, 98% less than the same period in 2019. TUI's chief executive officer, Fritz Joussen announced that the firm was considering selling the Marella cruise line.

In March 2022, the company's largest single shareholder, Alexei Mordashov, a Russian oligarch and confidante of Vladimir Putin, was placed under sanctions due to the 2022 Russian invasion of Ukraine.

Corporate affairs 
See below the financial information of TUI AG:

Operations

The TUI Group in 2014 operated:
 1,600 travel agencies
 150 aircraft
 16 cruise liners
 380 hotels and resorts
 Over 5M card payments annually

Tour operators

Aviation
TUI Group owns five European airlines, inherited from TUI Travel, making it the largest tourism group in Europe. The group airlines operate both scheduled and charter flights to more than 150 destinations worldwide departing from more than 60 airports in nine European countries. With a Fleet of 137 In May 2015, the TUI Group announced it would rebrand its existing five airline brands under one airline banner in the course of the coming years, to be titled ‘TUI’. Arkefly (now TUI fly Netherlands), Jetairfly (now TUI fly Belgium), Thomson Airways (now TUI Airways), TUIfly (now TUI fly Deutschland) and TUIfly Nordic (now TUI fly Nordic) will maintain the separate air operator's certificates (AOCs), but will operate under "one central organisation" with "one engineering & maintenance function".

Until March 2019, TUI also owned Corsair International. It sold a majority stake to Intro Aviation of Germany. It does, however, retain a 27% minority stake in the airline.

Airlines

TUI Group fleet
The TUI Group fleet includes the following aircraft, as of December 2022:

Hotels
TUI's hotel brands include:

 Blue: Premium resorts with a focus on local culture
 Family Life:  Resorts with a focus on children's activities and entertainment
 Magic Life: All Inclusive resorts offering 24-hour facilities
 Sensatori: luxury (five-star), all-inclusive resorts
 Sensimar: hotels with up to 250 rooms, aimed at adult and couples travellers and not families

Cruise lines
 Hapag-Lloyd
 Marella Cruises (United Kingdom)
 TUI Cruises (Deutschland)
 TUI River Cruises

Sponsorship
TUI sponsored Bundesliga club Hannover 96. The airline branch TUIfly's main hub is at Hannover-Langenhagen Airport and it had sponsored the football team since the 2002–2003 season. On 31 March 2011, TUI announced Hannover 96 would be playing "with a smile on their chest" for another 3 years, as it extended the sponsorship contract. The current sponsor contract ran out, but it made TUI the longest-running association with any of the 18 Bundesliga teams, with 12 years as the sponsor. As part of the sponsorship, TUI was the shirt sponsor, as well as having had advertisements on the perimeter fencing of the AWD-Arena, Hannover's home stadium. There was also advertising in the stadium, on the billboards by the pitch and banners around the stadium, and TUI will also remain the sponsor of the Hannover 96 Football School.

Sustainability
In 2015 launched its sustainability strategy called "Better Holidays, Better World", built around four core pillars. These are areas where TUI has been aiming aim to make a positive impact: their our own operations, influencing the value chain and customers, and across the wider tourism industry. A goal was set to deliver 10 million ‘greener and fairer’ holidays per year by 2020. In April 2021 TUI published that the goal was achieved. Over the course of six years (2015 to 2020), 43 million “greener and fairer” holidays had been delivered, with 10.3 million customers staying in hotels with sustainability certifications in 2019 alone.

Controversies

A 2018 study in the UK found that Tui had the largest gender pay gap reported to date by a major UK company, with its male employees paid more than twice what female employees are paid.

In August 2018, some air passengers questioned the distribution of gendered stickers to children on a flight: "future pilot" for boys, "future cabin crew" for girls.

TUI has become the main airline carrying out charter deportation flights for the UK Home Office. It is estimated that in November and December 2020 TUI carried out the deportation of more than 150 people in 13 flights to 23 destinations for the Home Office.

On 20 May 2022, the German TV Programme ZDF-Magazin Royale dedicated an episode to the history of TUI. It reported that Preussag was active in World War II producing bombs for the Nazi Party. Later Preussag also provided chemicals to Saddam Hussein's in Iraq, so facilitating the development of chemical weapons. The company were also supportive of the regime of Muammar Gaddafi in Libya and helped to build a factory for the production of chemical bombs. The management responded to a request for information, by saying that they were not aware of the company's history.

In May 2022, it was reported that the Russian oligarch Alexei Mordashov had made a transfer of a holding of 29.9% of the company: TUI failed to follow the rules and verify the new owner of the shares. In addition, the transfer was a violation of the sanctions against Russia by the European Union, which sanctioned Mordashov personally.

See also

References

External links

 
 

 
Holding companies of Germany
German companies established in 1923
Companies based in Hanover
Companies listed on the London Stock Exchange
Companies listed on the Frankfurt Stock Exchange
German brands
Holding companies established in 1923
Hospitality companies established in 1923
Multinational companies headquartered in Germany
Shipping companies of Germany
Transport companies established in 1923
Travel and holiday companies of Germany
Airlines for Europe